Countess Charlotte Flandrina of Nassau (Antwerp, 18 August 1579 – St.Croix (near Poitiers), 16 April 1640) was a french abbess. She was the fourth daughter of William the Silent and his third spouse Charlotte of Bourbon.

Biography

After her mother's death in 1582, her French grandfather asked for Charlotte Flandrina to stay with him.

Against the will of her paternal family, she was raised to become a Catholic nun by her maternal aunt Jeanne de Bourbon, abbess of Jouarre de Ste. Croix in Poitiers, and became a nun in 1595, succeeding her aunt as abbess in 1605.

She spent her life in the convent, tending to religion and religious charity. She maintained a correspondence with her stepmother and her sisters, and while she sometimes attempted to convert them, their relationship was a good one, and her sisters Elisabeth Flandrika and Charlotte Brabantina sometimes visited her.

Ancestry

References

Charlotte Flandrina: biography on Worldroots

1579 births
1640 deaths
Charlotte Flandrina
16th-century French nuns
17th-century French nuns
Daughters of monarchs